Slim Shoulders is a lost 1922 silent film society drama directed by Alan Crosland and starring Irene Castle.

Cast
Irene Castle - Naomi Warren
Rod La Rocque - Richard Langden
Anders Randolf - Edward Langden
Warren Cook - John Clinton Warren
Mario Carillo - Count Giulo Morranni
Marie Burke - Mrs. Warren

References

External links
Slim Shoulders at IMDb.com

1922 films
American silent feature films
Films directed by Alan Crosland
Lost American films
American black-and-white films
Silent American drama films
1922 drama films
Films distributed by W. W. Hodkinson Corporation
1922 lost films
Lost drama films
1920s American films